Westland Market Mall is a mall located in the city of Spruce Grove Alberta. Not all of the stores are located in the main building

Stores 
Bags and Luggage 
 Mobil Klinik
 Shell Gas Station
 Shoppers Drug Mart
Ricky's All Day Grill
 Code Ninja
 Elegance Hair Salon
 Sylvan Learning Center
+ Exelby & Partners
 Dales Jewelers & Goldsmith 
 Indigo Spirit
 Pet Valu
Trident Keymart 
Value Village
Vitality Health Foods
Browns Social House 
 M&M's food Market
Ardene
Bootlegger
Cleo
Ricki's
Ann's Nail Spa
 Sally Beauty.
Grove Hearing Clinic
Invision Optical
Dr. Milton and Associates Optometry Office

Food services
Tim Hortons 
Browns Social House
Mama Donair and Pizza
Ricky's All Day Grill

Anchors
Staples
Bulk Barn
Shoppers Drug Mart

Services
Shell Gas

References

Retail buildings in Canada